Analucheh (also Romanized as Anālūcheh; also known as Anālūjeh and Enālūjeh) is a village in Kabutarsorkh Rural District, in the Central District of Chadegan County, Isfahan Province, Iran. At the 2006 census, its population was 1,813, in 470 families.

References 

Populated places in Chadegan County